Senecio vernalis is one of the European species of Senecio, an annual that is also known as eastern groundsel. While it has been long classified as Senecio vernalis, this species has more recently been described as a subspecies of Senecio leucanthemifolius and is now included by some in that species.

Description
Eastern groundsel is a "lovely yellow-flowering weed found by the roadside and on the edges of fields" that can be sometimes confused with S. eboracensis.

Stems and leaves Leaves usually wavey, dissected, with lateral lobes that are about as long as width of central undivided portion, usually conspicuously covered with fine hairs. The edges are serrated. Leaves alternate one leaf per node along the stem.

Seeds The oldest collection of seeds recorded was 16 years; average germination change for these was from 100% to 82.5%, with a mean storage period 13 years.

A Senecio and a diploid, Senecio vernalis is part of a species group along with S. flavus, S. gallicus, S. squalidus and S. glaucus who are widespread geographically and interesting for the study of genecology (the study of genetic differences in relation to the environment) and plant evolution.

Common names

Distribution 

Native:
Palearctic:
Western Asia: Cyprus, Iran, Iraq, Israel, Jordan, Lebanon, Syria, Turkey
Caucasus: Armenia, Azerbaijan, Georgia, Ciscaucasia, Dagestan
Middle Asia: Turkmenistan
Middle Europe: Austria, Hungary, Poland
East Europe: Belarus, Croatia, Estonia, Crimea, Latvia, Lithuania, Ukraine
Southeastern Europe: Albania, Bulgaria, Greece, Romania, Slovenia, Bosnia and Herzegovina, Montenegro, Serbia, Macedonia. Kosovo

Subspecies or varieties which are also synonyms
Senecio leucanthemifolius subsp. vernalis (Waldst. & Kit.) Greuter
Misapplied names
Senecio coronopifolius sec. Grossgejm, A. A.
Senecio gallicus sec. Demiri, M. 
Senecio gallicus sec. Josifović, M. & al.
Senecio gallicus sec. Hayek, A. von

References

External links

 
 

vernalis
Flora of Lebanon